Al-Rafid is a village in southern Syria, administratively part of the Quneitra Governorate (Golan Heights), in the portion of the province under the United Nations Disengagement Observer Force Zone. According to the Syria Central Bureau of Statistics, al-Rafid had a population of 2,263 in the 2004 census.

The town has been claimed by pro-Assadist forces during the Syrian Civil War.

References

External links
Boutmiye-map, 20K

Towns in Quneitra Governorate